Vesperae solennes de confessore (Solemn Vespers for a Confessor), K. 339, is a sacred choral composition, written by Wolfgang Amadeus Mozart in 1780. It is scored for SATB choir and soloists, violin I, violin II, 2 trumpets, 3 trombones colla parte, 2 timpani, and basso continuo (violoncello, double bass, and organ, with optional bassoon obbligato).

The setting was composed for liturgical use in the Salzburg Cathedral. The title "de confessore" was not Mozart's own, and was added by a later hand to his manuscript. It suggests that the work was intended for vespers held on a specific day on the liturgical calendar of saints ("confessors"); however, the saint in question has not been conclusively established if there even was one. This was Mozart's final choral work composed for the cathedral.

Structurally, it is very similar to Vesperae solennes de Dominica (K. 321), composed in 1779. The setting is divided into 6 movements; as in Dominica, a setting of the Minor Doxology (Gloria Patri) concludes all movements, each recapitulating the opening themes. The first three psalms are scored in a bold, exuberant manner, contrasting with the strict, stile antico counterpoint of the a cappella fourth psalm, and the tranquility of the fifth movement. The Magnificat sees a return to the style of the opening settings.

 Dixit Dominus (Psalm 110) Allegro vivace, C major, 3/4
 Confitebor tibi Domine (Psalm 111) Allegro, E-flat major, common time
 Beatus vir qui timet Dominum (Psalm 112) Allegro vivace, G major, 3/4
 Laudate pueri Dominum (Psalm 113) Allegro, D minor, cut common time
 Laudate Dominum omnes gentes (Psalm 117) Andante, F major, 6/8
 Mozart departs from the structure of K. 321 in this movement. The earlier setting of Laudate Dominum is a highly melismatic soprano solo, with no choral interlude. In K. 339, the soprano solo is much simpler; the choir quietly enters at the conclusion of the psalm with the Gloria Patri, and the soloist rejoins them at the Amen.
 This movement is well known outside the context of the larger work, and is often performed in isolation.
Magnificat (Canticle for Vespers) Andante, C major, common time
—"Et exultavit..." Allegro, C major, common time

References

External links 
 
 
 Steiner, R., Falconer, K., Kirsch, W., & Bullivant, R.  (2001, January 1). Magnificat. Grove Music Online. Ed.   Retrieved 13 Sep. 2018, from 

 Aria . Arranged for cello and 5 double-basses, sung by Megan Marie Hart.

Compositions by Wolfgang Amadeus Mozart
1780 compositions
Choral compositions
Psalm settings
Magnificat settings
Vespers settings